Charlotte Pullein-Thompson (born 1957), also known as Charlotte Popescu, is an author of cookbooks and books related to horses and ponies. Although she married and became Charlotte Fyfe, she has not published under her married name.

Daughter of children's author Christine Pullein-Thompson, niece of Denis Cannan, Diana Pullein-Thompson and Josephine Pullein-Thompson. She is great granddaughter of Charles Cannan and Mary Wedderburn, granddaughter of Joanna Cannan, great niece of May Cannan. She is also related to Gilbert Cannan.

Following her mother's, aunt's and grandmother's steps, she has published pony books, although she has branched out in other areas.

Pony Books

Pony Care from A-Z
Horse and Pony Quiz Book No. 1
Horse and Pony Quiz Books No. 2
Horses at Work (History in focus)

She also drew the illustrations for her mother's Follyfoot Pony Quiz Book (1974).

Other Books
The Apple Cookbook
The Summer Fruits Cookbook
The Honey Cookbook
The Autumn Fruits Cookbook
Best Hens For You: Choosing Breeds for the Garden
Fruits of the Hedgerow and Unusual Garden Fruits: Gather them, Cook them, Eat them
Hens in the Garden, Eggs in the Kitchen
Vegetables: Grow Them, Cook Them, Eat Them
Wild Food, Garden Food - Gather and Cook through the Year
Chicken Runs and Vegetable Plots
Chickopedia
The Tears of War; the Love Story of a Young Poet and a War Hero: May Wedderburn Cannan and Bevil Quiller-Couch
War's Long Shadow: 69 Months of the Second World War (editor)

References

External links
 
 Charlotte Popescu at LC Authorities, 1 record, and WorldCat

1957 births
Animal care and training writers
British animal welfare scholars
British cookbook writers
English food writers
English non-fiction writers
Living people